Lichine, a surname, may refer to:

People:
 Alexis Lichine, Russian/American wine writer, vintner and négociant
 David Lichine, Russian/American ballet dancer

Other:
 Château Prieuré-Lichine, Bordeaux wine estate still bearing the name of former owner Alexis Lichine
 Alexis Lichine's classification of Bordeaux wine, the Classification des Grands Crus Rouges de Bordeaux rating of Bordeaux estates
 Lichine (horse), a Thoroughbred racehorse